Steven Smith (born December 18, 1976) is an American football coach and former player who is the offensive coordinator and offensive line coach for the New Jersey Generals of the United States Football League (USFL). He was the head football coach at Lincoln University in Jefferson City, Missouri, a position he held from December 2017 to May 2019. Smith previously served in a variety coaching roles at different levels of football, including a stint as assistant offensive line coach for the 2012 Kansas City Chiefs of the National Football League (NFL) under head coach Romeo Crennel. In 2019, he became the offensive line coach for the Seattle Dragons of the XFL. In March 2022, Smith was announced as the offensive coordinator and offensive line coach for head coach Mike Riley and the New Jersey Generals.

Head coaching record

References

1976 births
Living people
American football fullbacks
Albany State Golden Rams football coaches
Detroit Fury coaches
Frankfurt Galaxy coaches
Kansas City Chiefs coaches
Langston Lions football players
Lincoln Blue Tigers football coaches
New Jersey Generals (2022) coaches
Rhein Fire coaches
Seattle Dragons coaches
Southern Illinois Salukis football players
Virginia State Trojans football coaches
Players of American football from Chicago
African-American coaches of American football
African-American players of American football
20th-century African-American sportspeople
21st-century African-American sportspeople